Dennis Longhorn (born 12 September 1950 in Hythe, Hampshire, England) is an English former professional footballer. He played for Bournemouth, Mansfield Town, Sunderland, Sheffield United, Aldershot, Colchester United and Chelmsford City.

Center Parcs
Dennis now runs the football school at Center Parcs, Elveden Forest, and where he has worked for nearly 31 years following retirement from professional football.

References

External links

1950 births
Living people
English footballers
AFC Bournemouth players
Mansfield Town F.C. players
Sunderland A.F.C. players
Sheffield United F.C. players
Aldershot F.C. players
Colchester United F.C. players
Chelmsford City F.C. players
Association football midfielders